Elliot Jorge Simões Inácio (born 20 December 1999) is a professional footballer who plays as a winger for  club Salford City. Born in Portugal, he has represented the Angola national team.

Simões began his career with the youth teams of Portuguese clubs Benfica and Sporting CP, before moving to England to play with F.C. United of Manchester, where he made his senior debut. He turned professional with Barnsley in 2019, and spent time on loan with Doncaster Rovers, before moving to French club Nancy.

Club career

Early career
Simões began his career with Benfica and Sporting CP. He joined F.C. United of Manchester at the age of 16, making his first-team debut in April 2018.

Barnsley
Simões signed for Barnsley in January 2019, signing a three-and-a-half-year contract. He made his senior debut for Barnsley on 19 September, appearing as a substitute for the last 10 minutes of the match. He scored his first goal for Barnsley on 2 January 2020 in a 2–1 defeat to Derby County. In January 2021 he moved on loan to Doncaster Rovers until the end of the 2020–21 season.

Nancy
In August 2021 he was signed by French club Nancy for an undisclosed fee. On 14 November, Simões made his Nancy debut in a 3–1 victory in the Coupe de France over Lorraine de Plantiéres. On 27 November, he scored his first goal for the club in the following round of the cup, in a 1–0 victory over Soleil Bischheim. He made his league debut on 5 March 2022, in a 0–1 home defeat to Grenoble Foot.

Salford City
In July 2022, he returned to England to sign a one-year contract with EFL League Two side Salford City.

International career
In October 2020, Simões was called up by the Angolan national team. He made his debut on 13 October 2020 as a 78th minute substitution during a friendly match against Mozambique.

Style of play
In 2019, Simões was described by new team Barnsley as an "exciting, direct and pacey winger".

Career statistics

References

1999 births
Living people
Angolan footballers
Angola international footballers
Portuguese footballers
Portuguese sportspeople of Angolan descent
Black Portuguese sportspeople
S.L. Benfica footballers
Sporting CP footballers
F.C. United of Manchester players
Barnsley F.C. players
Doncaster Rovers F.C. players
AS Nancy Lorraine players
Salford City F.C. players
National League (English football) players
English Football League players
Association football wingers
Portuguese expatriate footballers
Angolan expatriate footballers
Portuguese expatriates in England
Angolan expatriates in England
Expatriate footballers in England
Portuguese expatriates in France
Angolan expatriates in France
Expatriate footballers in France
Ligue 2 players